Daniel Kahl (born March 30, 1960 in Monrovia, California) is an American foreign television personality (gaijin tarento) and entrepreneur in Japan. He is famous for speaking fluent Yamagata-ben, the dialect of Yamagata Prefecture, a predominantly rural area. He mainly works as a television reporter for human interest stories in Japan, such as travel and gourmet programs.

Following the 2011 Tohoku earthquake and tsunami in eastern Japan on 11 March 2011, Kahl was active in relief efforts in the affected areas, hauling food, supplies and equipment for fishermen. He also helped in combating the spread of false information regarding the spread of radiation in Fukushima after the nuclear accident there.

References

External links

Official agency profile 

1960 births
Living people
American people of German descent
Expatriate television personalities in Japan
American television personalities
Male television personalities
American expatriates in Japan
People from Greater Los Angeles